Same-sex marriage in Ohio has been legal since the U.S. Supreme Court's ruling in Obergefell v. Hodges, a landmark decision in which the court struck down Ohio's statutory and constitutional bans on same-sex marriage on June 26, 2015. The case was named after plaintiff Jim Obergefell, who sued the state of Ohio after officials refused to recognize his marriage on the death certificate of his husband. Same-sex marriages were performed in Ohio beginning shortly after the Supreme Court released its ruling, as local officials implemented the order.

Two lawsuits in federal court challenged Ohio's denial of marriage rights to same-sex couples, asking Ohio to recognize marriages from other jurisdictions for the purpose of recording a spouse on a death certificate and for recording parents' names on birth certificates. Judge Timothy Black, of the U.S. District Court for the Southern District of Ohio, ruled that Ohio must recognize same-sex marriages from other jurisdictions. He stayed general enforcement of his ruling, but ordered the state to recognize out-of-state same-sex marriages for completing death certificates in all cases and for four birth certificates. Attorney General Mike DeWine appealed the rulings to the Sixth Circuit Court of Appeals, which consolidated the two cases and held oral arguments on August 6, 2014. That court upheld Ohio's ban on same-sex marriage on November 6, 2014. The U.S. Supreme Court overturned the decision and declared same-sex marriages legal in the United States in Obergefell v. Hodges on June 26, 2015.

Legal history

Restrictions 
On December 10, 2003, the Ohio House of Representatives, by a 73–23 vote, passed the Defense of Marriage Act. The Ohio Senate passed the act by an 18–15 vote on January 21, 2004, and Governor Bob Taft signed it into law on February 6. Ohio's Defense of Marriage Act banned same-sex marriage, along with the "statutory benefits of legal marriage to nonmarital relationships". It also prohibited state recognition of out-of-state same-sex marriages.

On November 2, 2004, Ohio voters approved State Issue 1, a state-initiated constitutional amendment that prohibited the recognition of same-sex marriage, as well as any "legal status for relationships of unmarried individuals that intends to approximate the design, qualities, significance or effect of marriage" in the state of Ohio. The amendment went into effect on December 2, 2004.

Initiative to repeal constitutional ban
In 2013, FreedomOhio and Equality Ohio sought state officials' approval of a ballot initiative that would replace the constitutional amendment and allow same-sex marriage. Two prominent Republicans, Senator Rob Portman and former Attorney General Jim Petro, gave their support to the campaign.

Lawsuits

State cases
Lacking legal representation and support from the local LGBT community, a lesbian couple from Dayton sued the state in Thorton v. Timmers in 1974, after being denied a marriage license. In 1975, a state court denied their request for a license and concluded that "it is the express legislative intent that those persons who may be joined in marriage must be of different sexes." A similar case, Fullington v. Ohio, was brought by Russ Stalk and David Fullington in 1990, but dismissed by an Ohio county municipal court on October 11, 1990.

Obergefell v. Hodges

A Cincinnati same-sex couple filed a lawsuit, Obergefell v. Kasich, in the U.S. District Court for the Southern District of Ohio on July 19, 2013, alleging that the state discriminated against same-sex couples who had lawfully married out-of-state. The named-defendant was Governor John Kasich. On July 22, 2013, District Judge Timothy S. Black granted the couple's motion, temporarily restraining the vital statistics registrar from accepting any death certificate unless it recorded the deceased's status at death as "married" and his partner as "surviving spouse". On August 13, 2013, Black extended the temporary restraining order until the end of December. The case was restyled Obergefell v. Wymyslo on September 25, with Health Department Director Theodore Wymyslo as the named defendant, and funeral director Robert Grunn was added to the lawsuit so that he could obtain clarification of his legal obligations under Ohio law when serving clients with same-sex spouses. On December 23, 2013, Judge Black ruled that Ohio's refusal to recognize same-sex marriages from other jurisdictions was discriminatory and ordered Ohio to recognize same-sex marriages from other jurisdictions on death certificates. 
	 	
Judge Black ruled in a similar case about the same time. In Henry v. Wymyslo, four same-sex couples legally married in other states sued to force the state to list both parents on their children's birth certificates. On April 14, 2014, Black ruled that Ohio must recognize same-sex marriages from other jurisdictions, and on April 16 stayed enforcement of his ruling except for the birth certificates sought by the plaintiffs. Attorney General Mike DeWine announced plans to appeal the decision.

On May 20, the Sixth Circuit consolidated the two cases, now Obergefell v. Hodges with the appointment of Richard Hodges as the new director of the Ohio Department of Health, and on November 6 ruled 2–1 that Ohio's ban on same-sex marriage did not violate the Constitution of the United States. On January 16, 2015, the U.S. Supreme Court consolidated Obergefell v. Hodges with three other cases from Kentucky, Michigan and Tennessee, agreeing to review the case. After hearing oral arguments the following April, the court ruled on June 26, 2015 that Ohio's constitutional ban violated the Fourteenth Amendment of the U.S. Constitution on equal protection and due process grounds. The ruling meant that the earlier Sixth Circuit Court of Appeals decision was reversed and same-sex couples began immediately marrying in the state. Governor Kasich said he was disappointed by the court ruling but said, "They've made their decision and we just move on". DeWine said he would comply with the decision, "While Ohio argued that the Supreme Court should let this issue ultimately be decided by the voters, the Court has now made its decision." Senator Portman issued the following statement, "In 2013, I decided to support marriage equality after I came to understand this issue better in the context of my own family. I can't help but view today's Supreme Court decision through that same lens. And as a father, I welcome today's decision. As I have said before, I would have preferred for this issue to be resolved by the democratic process in the states because I think you build a more lasting consensus that way. Now the Court has reached its decision, I hope we can move past the division and polarization the issue has caused." The Mayor of Columbus, Michael B. Coleman, said, "I am pleased with the Supreme Court's decision to overturn the ban on same-sex marriage because it represents true equality for all, regardless of who they love." State Representative Nickie Antonio welcomed the ruling, "From this day forward, all families – including families like mine – have the opportunity to experience the full depth and breadth of constitutional equality and the freedom to celebrate the love that binds our family, and all families – including those of same sex couples."

Among the first same-sex couples to marry in Ohio were Roy Keith Garrett and Chris Richardson in Cleveland on June 26 just hours after the Supreme Court's ruling. Two more couples, Jamie Moore and Tim Scott, and Patricia Hanen and Elaine McCoy, were married just minutes later in the same city. Jimmie Beall and Mindy Ross were the first same-sex couple to receive a marriage license in Columbus. The couple had unsuccessfully applied for a license every Valentine's Day for the past 7 or 8 years. Across the state, many couples rushed to their county courthouse in the hours after the court decision to apply for licenses, including in Dayton, Ironton, and Toledo. Mayor John Cranley officiated at the weddings of half a dozen same-sex couples on June 26 at the Fountain Square in Cincinnati.

Developments after legalization
On March 15, 2016, the Ohio Supreme Court decided to issue gender-neutral references in family court cases instead of terms such as "husband" and "wife". The order includes "father", "mother", "parent" and "spouse" in its description of terms expressing familial relationships, which cover the areas of divorce, child support, guardianships, adoption, domestic relations and domestic violence. The order took effect the same day.

Demographics and marriage statistics
Data from the 2000 U.S. census showed that 18,937 same-sex couples were living in Ohio. By 2005, this had increased to 30,669 couples, likely attributed to same-sex couples' growing willingness to disclose their partnerships on government surveys. Same-sex couples lived in all counties of the state and constituted 0.8% of coupled households and 0.4% of all households in the state. Most couples lived in Franklin, Cuyahoga and Hamilton counties, but the counties with the highest percentage of same-sex couples were Franklin (0.74% of all county households) and Delaware (0.55%). Same-sex partners in Ohio were on average younger than opposite-sex partners, and more likely to be employed. However, the average and median household incomes of same-sex couples were lower than different-sex couples, and same-sex couples were also far less likely to own a home than opposite-sex partners. 22% of same-sex couples in Ohio were raising children under the age of 18, with an estimated 11,950 children living in households headed by same-sex couples in 2005.

2018 estimates from the United States Census Bureau showed that there were about 32,900 same-sex households in Ohio. This represented an increase compared to 2017 (about 31,400 households), 2016 (about 27,600 households), 2015 (about 26,850 households) and 2014 (about 26,000 households). The Census Bureau estimated that 54.4% of same-sex couples living in the state in 2018 were married.

Public opinion 
A September 2012 poll by The Washington Post indicated that 52% of Ohio residents surveyed said that same-sex marriage should be legal, while 37 percent said it should be illegal.

A March 2013 Saperstein poll for The Columbus Dispatch revealed that 54% of Ohio residents surveyed supported a proposed amendment that would repeal the state's 2004 constitutional ban on same-sex marriage. An August 2013 Public Policy Polling (PPP) survey of 551 Ohio voters found that 48% of respondents supported same-sex marriage, while 42% remained opposed and 10% said they were not sure. The survey was the first from PPP to find plurality support for same-sex marriages in Ohio. Pollsters also found that 69% of Ohio respondents supported either marriage (44%) or civil unions (25%) for same-sex couples, including a majority (54%) of Republican voters. 27% of respondents said that there should be no legal recognition of same-sex relationships.

A February 2014 Quinnipiac University poll found that 50% of Ohio voters supported same-sex marriage, while 44% were opposed, and 5% did not know or were indifferent. Another February 2014 poll, released two days later by the Public Religion Research Institute (PRRI), found that 53% of Ohio residents supported same-sex marriage, while 38% were opposed, and 9% did not know or refused to answer.

An April 2014 poll by SurveyUSA found that 49% of Ohio voters thought same-sex marriage should not be legalized, with 43% thinking it should be and 8% were unsure. An October 2014 poll by YouGov found that 45% of Ohio respondents were in favor of same-sex marriage, with 40% against such unions and 15% being unsure.

A 2016 PRRI poll showed a 56% majority in favor of same-sex marriage in Ohio. In 2017, the PRRI found that 61% of Ohio respondents supported same-sex marriage, while 33% opposed it and 6% were unsure. A PRRI survey conducted between March 8 and November 9, 2021 showed that 69% of Ohio respondents supported same-sex marriage, while 30% were opposed.

See also
LGBT rights in Ohio
Domestic partnership in Ohio
Same-sex marriage in the United States

References

LGBT in Ohio
Ohio
2015 in LGBT history
2015 in Ohio